The  Little League World Series was held in South Williamsport, Pennsylvania, from August 15 until August 25. Eight teams from the United States and eight from throughout the world competed in the 67th edition of this tournament. The Musashi-Fuchū Little League of Tokyo, Japan, defeated the Eastlake Little League of Chula Vista, California, 6–4 in the championship game. For the country of Japan, this was their ninth LLWS championship overall, second consecutive, and the third in four years. This was the last World Series to feature players born in the 20th century.

Tournament changes
It was announced on August 29, 2012 that three of the eight international regions had been realigned. The results of the realignment included Australia having its own region, meaning that the national champion of that country would be given a berth into the Little League World Series. Also, teams from Middle Eastern countries (except Israel and Turkey) would compete to qualify with teams in the Asia-Pacific Region to form the Asia-Pacific and Middle East region. Teams from Africa would compete to qualify with teams from Europe to form the Europe and Africa region.

Teams

Republic of China, commonly known as Taiwan, due to complicated relations with People's Republic of China, is recognized by the name Chinese Taipei by majority of international organizations including Little League Baseball (LLB). For more information, please see Cross-Strait relations.

Team rosters

Notable players
 Robert Hassell was selected eighth overall by the San Diego Padres in the 2020 MLB draft.

Results

The drawing to determine the opening round pairings took place on June 13, 2013.

United States bracket

International bracket

Crossover games
Teams that lose their first two games get to play a crossover game against a team from the other side of the bracket that also lost its first two games. These games are labeled Game A and Game B.

Consolation game
The consolation game is played between the loser of the United States championship and the loser of the International championship.

World Championship

Home run count

No-hitter
Grant Holman of the Eastlake Little League (Chula Vista, CA)  tossed a no-hitter in the sixth game of the tournament against Grosse Pointe, Michigan.

Champion's path
The Musashi Fuchū LL reached the LLWS by winning all eight of their Tokyo and national tournament games. In total, they went undefeated with a 13–0 record.

Notes

References

 
Little League World Series
Little League World Series
Little League World Series